The 1959 BC Lions finished the season in third place in the W.I.F.U. with a 9–7 record and made the playoffs for the first time in franchise history. 
After hiring new coach Wayne Robinson and signing University of Iowa stars Randy Duncan (#1 overall pick in the NFL Draft) and Willie Fleming, the Lions were a much different team compared to the one a year before. 

The battle for a playoff spot came down to the last game of the season against the Calgary Stampeders, with both clubs holding 8–7 records, the loser would be out of the playoffs. The Lions won the game 10–8 and secured the first playoff spot in franchise history as well as the first home playoff game (the first in a two-game series). The Lions season would come to an end in the combined 61–15 West semi-finals loss to Edmonton, but the foundation had been laid for future success.

Regular season

Season standings

Season schedule

Playoffs

Semi-finals

Edmonton won the total-point series by 61–15. The Eskimos will play the Winnipeg Blue Bombers in the Western Finals.

Offensive leaders

1959 CFL Awards
None

References

BC Lions seasons
1959 Canadian Football League season by team
1959 in British Columbia